Leanchoil station was a railway station near Golden, British Columbia on the Canadian Pacific Railway. It bears the name of the farm near Forres, Scotland where Lord Strathcona had grown up with his mother.

The government of British Columbia geographic names website describes the location as "On Canadian Pacific Railway, NW. of junction of Beaverfoot and Kicking Horse Rivers, Kootenay Land District".

References

External links

Canadian Pacific Railway stations in British Columbia
Kootenay Land District